Efate is a genus of the spider family Salticidae (jumping spiders).

Description
These  ant-like spiders are three to five millimeters long. The carapace is flattened. E. raptor males have enlarged first legs, giving them a raptorial appearance.

The genus Rarahu from the same subfamily is rather similar, as is Sobasina.

Name
Efate is an island in the Republic of Vanuatu, where the first specimen was found. The salticid genus Araneotanna is also named after an island of Vanuatu.

Species
 Efate albobicinctus Berland, 1938 (Guam, Caroline Is., New Hebrides, Samoa, Fiji)
 Efate fimbriatus Berry, Beatty & Prószyn'ski, 1996 (Caroline Is., Marshall Is.)
 Efate raptor Berry, Beatty & Prószyn'ski, 1996 (Fiji)

References

External links
 Diagnostic drawings and photographs of E. albobicinctus
 Diagnostic drawings of E. fimbriatus
 Diagnostic drawings of E. raptor

Salticidae
Salticidae genera
Spiders of Oceania